Bulbophyllum cavipes is a species of orchid in the genus Bulbophyllum.

References

External links

cavipes